MyMobileWeb is an open-source product that simplifies the development of adaptive mobile web applications and portals, providing an advanced content & application adaptation environment. It is based on open-standards, Java and Java EE technology.

Description
Mobile Web interfaces designed with MyMobileWeb are defined once for all kind of devices. At runtime MyMobileWeb renders such interfaces in accordance with the characteristics and restrictions of the device and web browser used. Such characteristics are provided by a Device Description Repository such as WURFL or Device Atlas.

The pages are defined in a declarative language (based on Web Standards) made up with abstract visual controls and containers. Binding with structured sources of data is supported via the JSP 2.0 Expression Language. Automatic pagination is performed when necessary. JSR 170 API is also supported for content organization and storage, thus enabling the reuse of deployed Web content stored on a JSR 170 compatible content repository. The appearance is controlled through W-CSS and can be defined by configurable families of devices.

Other features of MyMobileWeb are an off-the-shelf internationalization support, an automatic validation framework that automatically generates scripting code when supported and an image transcoder. A more detailed description of its features can be found on the project features page.

Google launches a new certification program for mobile web developers:- intended to enable designers to flaunt their versatile web advancement aptitudes, regardless of how they learned them. The program joins Google's current affirmation programs for Android designers, cloud planners and information engineers.  The open book test cost $99 (or 6500 INR in India) to take and consist of various coding challenges and a 10-minute post employment survey, which enables you to clarify why you picked an offered answer for settle your exam questions. You'll have four hours to finish the coding difficulties and you can take three cuts at the exam on the off chance that you don't go in your first endeavor. A portion of the themes secured here incorporate fundamental site format and styling, dynamic web applications, execution improvement and reserving, and additionally testing and troubleshooting.

Eclipse plugin
In order to facilitate the development of mobile web pages using  an Eclipse plugin has been developed. This plugin is composed by a set of wizards and templates that prevent the developer from making tedious chores and automatically compiles and deploys the developed pages.

Acknowledgements
MyMobileWeb is an open-source R&D project under the Morfeo Open-Source Software Community. The project is founded by the Spanish Ministry of Industry, Tourism and Commerce under the Avanza Plan, and has been designated as a CELTIC flagship project of the CELTIC EUREKA Cluster.

References

External links
 Morfeo's MyMobileWeb Mobile Web development platform
 Getting Started guide
 W3C's Device Independent Authoring Language (DIAL) (W3C Working Draft 27 July 2007)
 W3C's DDR Simple API (W3C Recommendation)

Mobile software